Lobelia floridana, commonly known as Florida lobelia, is a species of flowering plant in the bellflower family (Campanulaceae) native the southeastern United States. It was first formally named in 1878 by Alvan Wentworth Chapman.

References

floridana
Flora of North America
Taxa named by Alvan Wentworth Chapman